The Gauliga Mitte was the highest football league in the Prussian province of Saxony and the German states of Thuringia and Anhalt from 1933 to 1945, all located in the center (German:Mitte) of Germany. Shortly after the formation of the league, the Nazis reorganised the administrative regions in Germany, and the Gaue Thuringia, Magdeburg-Anhalt and Halle-Merseburg replaced the states and Prussian province.

Overview
The league was introduced by the Nazi Sports Office in 1933, after the Nazi takeover of power in Germany. It replaced the Bezirksligas and Oberligas as the highest level of play in German football competitions.

Until the formation of the Gauliga, the region was covered by a number of local leagues and, together with clubs from state of Saxony, they played out a Central German championship (German: Mittel-Deutsche Meisterschaft).

In its first season, the league had ten clubs, playing each other once at home and once away. The league champion then qualified for the German championship. The bottom two teams were relegated. The league operated on the same modus until the outbreak of World War II  in 1939.

Due to the effects of the war, the 1939–40 and 1940–41 seasons were played with only eight clubs. In 1941, the league returned to a ten-club strength, which it retained until 1944.

The imminent collapse of Nazi Germany in 1945 gravely affected all Gauligas and football in the region was split into six regional groups. However, none of them played more than a few games before the arrival of the Red Army, and the end of the war ended all competitions.

Aftermath
With the end of the Nazi era, the Gauligas ceased to exist and the region found itself in the Soviet occupation zone. The DDR-Oberliga was formed in the following years as the highest level of play in the new country of East Germany and the region became part of the East German football league system.

Virtually all football clubs in the region were dissolved and replaced with clubs controlled by the new communist government. Of those, some readopted the pre-1945 names after the German reunification in 1990.

Founding members of the league
The ten founding members and their league positions in the 1932–33 season were:
 FC Wacker Halle, champion Saale division
 SV 08 Steinach, champion Südthüringen division
 VfL Bitterfeld, champion Mulde division
 SpVgg Erfurt
 SV Victoria 96 Magdeburg
 SC 95 Erfurt, champion Nordthüringen division
 1. SV Jena 03, champion Ostthüringen division
 SV Merseburg 1899
 Fortuna Magdeburg, champion Elbe division
 SC Preußen Magdeburg

Winners and runners-up of the Gauliga Mitte
The winners and runners-up of the league:

Placings in the Gauliga Mitte 1933-44
The complete list of all clubs participating in the league:

References

Sources
 Die deutschen Gauligen 1933-45 - Heft 1-3  Tables of the Gauligas 1933–45, publisher: DSFS
 Kicker Almanach,  The yearbook on German football from Bundesliga to Oberliga, since 1937, published by the Kicker Sports Magazine

External links
  The Gauligas Das Deutsche Fussball Archiv
 Germany - Championships 1902-1945 at RSSSF.com

Sports leagues established in 1933
1933 establishments in Germany
1945 disestablishments in Germany
Gauliga
Football competitions in Saxony-Anhalt
Football competitions in Thuringia
Sports leagues disestablished in 1945